Jessica Burroughs (born November 2, 1993) is an American former collegiate All-American professional softball pitcher. She played college softball at Florida State, being named a four-time all-conference and back-to-back Pitcher of the Year in her last two seasons. She would help the Seminoles to a semifinal finish at the 2016 Women's College World Series. Burroughs was selected first overall by the USSSA Pride in the 2017 NPF Draft. She went on to play for and win consecutive titles with the Pride in 2018 and 2019. She later played in the inaugural season of the Athletes Unlimited Softball league in 2020.

Early life
Burroughs was born to parents Alesia Taylor and Joe Burroughs on November 2, 1993, in Warner Robins, Georgia. Burroughs attended Houston County High School where she lettered in softball four times. She graduated in 2012.

College career
Burroughs signed to play college softball at Florida State Seminoles, although she redshirted in 2013. In 2014 and 2015, Burroughs was an effective backup to Lacey Waldrop, earning All-ACC second team honors in both seasons. Burroughs was named the ACC Pitcher of the Year in 2016, as well as a Third Team All-American. She was named ACC Pitcher of the Year again in 2017 and a First Team All-American.

Professional career
Burroughs was drafted as the first overall pick in the 2017 NPF Draft by the USSSA Florida Pride, becoming the first player ever out of the ACC to be drafted at number one.

Career statistics

References

External links
 

1993 births
Florida State Seminoles softball players
Living people
People from Warner Robins, Georgia
Softball players from Georgia (U.S. state)
USSSA Pride players